The Palestine Fair Trade Association (PFTA) is a Palestinian national union of fair trade producing cooperatives, processors, and exporters. It was founded in 2004 by Palestinian-American entrepreneur Nasser Abufarha.

PFTA established the first internationally recognized standard for fair trade olive oil in coordination with the Fairtrade Labeling Organization (FLO) in 2004, and introduced fair trade and organic farming concepts to thousands of Palestinian farmers in the West Bank.

See also
 Canaan Fair Trade

References

External links
 
 Nasser Abufarha: Scholar and social entrepreneur

Fair trade organizations